Gideon Oliver is a prime time television series that ran on the ABC television network between February 1989 and May 1989 as part of the ABC Mystery Movie rotation, along with B.L. Stryker, Kojak  and Columbo. On the air for only five episodes, the series starred Louis Gossett Jr., and was created by Dick Wolf. The title character first appeared in the novel series by mystery writer Aaron Elkins.

Overview
Oliver is a Columbia University anthropology professor, utilizing his knowledge of past cultures to solve crimes throughout the Western Hemisphere. He is assisted by his adult daughter Zina (Shari Headley).

List of episodes

See also
Aaron Elkins

External links
 

1989 American television series debuts
1989 American television series endings
American Broadcasting Company original programming
1980s American crime drama television series
Television shows based on American novels
Television series by Universal Television
English-language television shows
The ABC Mystery Movie